Magadi is a Taluk headquarters located in Ramanagara district. The town is situated at a distance of 51 km from Bangalore. The founder of Bangalore, the great Kempegowda was a native of Kempapura, Magadi taluk. Magadi, having a rich cultural heritage was the largest boundary (Maha Gadi) marked during the rulers of Vijayanagar empire. The town was earlier known by names Maha Gadi or Mahalakshmi Gadi, later the British regime renamed the town as Magadi.
Magadi is also home to a popular Plywood Brand "Raajply"

Effect of urbanisation
In modern literature, the forests around Magadi were the setting of the true story "Old Munisamy and the Panther of Magadi" by the India born British hunter Kenneth Anderson. Since then, the wildlife around Magadi has been greatly reduced by poaching and habitat loss. The rise in real estate activities and illegal quarries operating around Magadi is causing enormous damage to the ecosystem and the town is fast becoming a part of the growing Bangalore district.

Agriculture
The important crops of the taluk are ragi, paddy, groundnut, coconut, arecanut, maize and mulberry. Magadi taluk is considered to be the semiarid region with an average annual rainfall of 795 mm, which is mainly contributed by south-west monsoon.

Temples
The small town of Magadi is home to historical temples of Shaiva and Vaishnava sects

Sri Ranganathswamy Temple is the main temple of Vaishnava sect in the town.

There are 5 Shiva temples located around the town making this place as one of the Panchalinga Kshethras. The 5 temples of Lord Shiva are
Sri Prasanna Someshwara temple. 
Sri Prasanna Rameshwara temple
Sri Kote Rameshwara temple
Sri Kashi Vishwanatha temple
Sri Gavi Gangadhareswara temple
Sri Kalaghattamma devi temple

Savanadurga, a small village at a distance of 12 km from Magadi has temples devoted to Lord Sri Veerabhadreshwara and Lord Lakshmi Narasimhaswamy.

Geography
It has an average elevation of 925 metres (3034 feet).

Demographics
 India census, Magadi had a population of 27,605. Males constitute 50% of the population and females 50%. Magadi has an average literacy rate of 69%, male literacy is 74%, and female literacy is 65%.

See also
Ajjahalli, Magadi	
Ajjanahalli, Magadi	
Magadi, Kenya

References

Cities and towns in Bangalore Rural district
Buildings and structures in Bangalore Urban district
Tourist attractions in Bangalore Urban district